Khvajeh Bolaghi (also Romanized as Khvājeh Bolāghī; also known as Khājeh Bolāgh and Khvājeh Bolāgh) is a village in Arshaq Sharqi Rural District, in the Central District of Ardabil County, Ardabil Province, Iran. In 2006, its population was 370, in 86 families.

References 

Towns and villages in Ardabil County